Madison Township is a township in Johnson County, Iowa, USA.

History
Madison Township was organized in 1860.

References

Townships in Johnson County, Iowa
Townships in Iowa
1860 establishments in Iowa